Horst Hrubesch (born 17 April 1951) is a German professional football manager and former player who last managed Hamburger SV. As a player, Hrubesch won three West German championships with his club side, Hamburger SV, as well as the European Cup title in 1983. He was a key member of the West Germany team that made it to the final of the 1982 World Cup, losing to Italy. His nickname was Das Kopfball-Ungeheuer (the Header Beast) for his heading skills as a centre forward.

Club career
Hrubesch played in small clubs until the age of 24 when he was signed by Rot-Weiss Essen. There, he played well enough that in 1978 Hamburger SV (HSV) bought him. At Hamburg he blossomed into one of the most productive forwards of the Bundesliga and was soon called up for the West German national team. Hrubesch formed an attacking partnership with fellow HSV player Manfred Kaltz, a right wingback whose crosses Hrubesch often headed in, or headed to teammates to provide them with scoring chances. Hrubesch won the West German championship three times with Hamburg, in 1979, 1982 and 1983; and his team finished second in the league standings twice, in 1980 and 1982. In all, he scored 96 goals in 159 matches for the club.

Hrubesch won the European Cup in 1983, captaining the team to a 1–0 win against favourites Juventus in the final in Athens. Three years earlier he had been on the team that lost the 1980 European Cup Final against Nottingham Forest, however he was injured shortly before the game and could only feature as a half time substitute. Hamburg reached one other major European final while Hrubesch was on the team, losing the 1982 UEFA Cup final against IFK Göteborg.

Hrubesch left Hamburg after the 1983 season to play for Belgian club Standard Liège.  After two years he returned to the Bundesliga to play for Borussia Dortmund, appearing in about half the club's games during his one season there. Over the course of his entire career he scored 136 goals in 224 games in the Bundesliga.

International career
West Germany's match-winning hero in the UEFA Euro 1980 Final in Rome against Belgium, Hrubesch scored two goals, the second a trademark bullet header, in the 89th minute. It was a day of redemption for the big Hamburger SV centre forward who a few weeks earlier had hobbled around the field with an ankle injury as his club lost the European Champion Clubs' Cup final to Nottingham Forest FC. A latecomer to the international scene, Hrubesch had only been called into the West Germany squad after Klaus Fischer broke his leg, and the game against Belgium was only his fifth international appearance. He would play for West Germany 21 times, scoring 6 goals, his last match being the losing 1982 FIFA World Cup final against Italy.

Hrubesch is also famous for having scored the winning penalty which defeated France in the 1982 FIFA World Cup semi-final, after an epic game which was tied 3–3 after extra-time. Minutes earlier, in the second extra-time period with France leading 3–2, it was Hrubesch who headed a cross from the left wing to Klaus Fischer, enabling his spectacular overhead kick equalizer. Irish television commentator Jimmy Magee during the shoot-out coined the nickname that made Hrubesch best known in the English-speaking world: "The man they call 'The Monster'."

Coaching career

Club football
Hrubesch started his coaching career with Rot-Weiss Essen He was there between 1 July 1986 and 14 September 1987. His first match was a 2–0 loss against Rot-Weiß Oberhausen on 25 July 1986. He had won two of nine league matches and a first round exit from the cup before leaving the club. His final match was a 3–1 loss to Rot-Weiß Oberhausen on 13 September 1987. He won 16 of his 47 league matches. Hrubesch then took over VfL Wolfsburg for the 1988–89 season. In the cup, he had a draw and a loss. This includes a 1–1 draw and a 6–1 loss against to Eintracht Frankfurt. Hrubesch then took over Swarovski Tirol from 1 January 1992 to 30 June 1992. His first match was a 2–0 win against Austria Salzburg. Hrubesch took over at Hansa Rostock between 4 January 1993 and 26 June 1993. His first match was a 3–0 loss to Waldhof Mannheim on 6 February 1993. Hrubesch took over as head coach of Dynamo Dresden on 22 November 1994 and was there until 1 March 1995. He failed to win any of his five matches. His first match was a 1–1 draw against Karlsruher SC on 26 November 1994. Dynamo Dresden also lost a 2–1 to Bayern Munich, 1–1 draw against Bayer Leverkusen, 1–0 loss to Werder Bremen, and a 2–0 loss to VfL Bochum. Hrubesch was head coach of Austria Wien for the 1995–96 season. His first match was a 4–0 win against Vorwärts Steyr on 2 August 1995. Hrubesch was head coach of Samsunspor for the 1997–98 season. Samsunspor finished second in Group 6 of the UEFA Intertoto Cup, three points behind Hamburger SV. Their record was three wins and a loss. In the league, they finished with a record of 14 wins, seven draws, and 13 losses in 34 matches.

On 3 May 2021, Hrubesch was appointed as manager of Hamburger SV for the last three matches of the 2020–21 2. Bundesliga season.

International

Hrubesch was head coach of Germany's B team from 22 March 1999. He was appointed assistant coach of Germany's A team on 8 May 2000. The coaching staff was reconstructed on 26 March 2002 with Uli Stielike becoming the new head coach of Germany's B team. In 2008, Hrubesch won the European Championship with the Germany U–19 team. On 9 January 2009, Hrubesch was named interim coach of the Germany U–21 team. Rainer Adrion was unavailable to become the permanent head coach until the summer. In June 2009, he guided Germany to the final of the 2009 UEFA European Under-21 Championship where they defeated England Under 21s by 4–0. On 11 November 2009, it was announced that he will begin to work as U-19 coach of the DFB. He returned to the Germany U–21 team after Rainer Adrion was sacked on 21 June 2013.

At the 2016 Summer Olympics, he was the coach when Germany won the silver medal.

On 13 March 2018, he was appointed as the head coach for the German women's national team.

Career record

Honours

As a player
Hamburger SV
Bundesliga: 1978–79, 1981–82, 1982–83
European Cup: 1982–83

West Germany 
UEFA European Championship: 1980
FIFA World Cup runner-up: 1982

Individual
UEFA European Championship Team of the Tournament: 1980
Bundesliga Torschützenkönig: 1981–82

As a coach
Germany U19
UEFA European Under-19 Championship: 2008

Germany U21
UEFA European Under-21 Championship: 2009

Germany U23
Summer Olympics silver medal: 2016

References

External links

1951 births
Living people
Sportspeople from Hamm
German footballers
West German expatriate footballers
Germany international footballers
Germany B international footballers
German football managers
Borussia Dortmund players
Hamburger SV players
Kicker-Torjägerkanone Award winners
1982 FIFA World Cup players
UEFA Euro 1980 players
UEFA European Championship-winning players
Rot-Weiss Essen players
Standard Liège players
Bundesliga players
2. Bundesliga players
Dynamo Dresden managers
FC Hansa Rostock managers
VfL Wolfsburg managers
FK Austria Wien managers
Rot-Weiss Essen managers
FC Swarovski Tirol managers
Association football forwards
Germany national under-21 football team managers
Footballers from North Rhine-Westphalia
Germany women's national football team managers
Hamburger SV managers
2. Bundesliga managers
Hammer SpVg players
Belgian Pro League players
West German expatriate sportspeople in Belgium
Expatriate footballers in Belgium
German expatriate sportspeople in Austria
German expatriate sportspeople in Turkey
Expatriate football managers in Austria
Expatriate football managers in Turkey
West German footballers
West German football managers
German expatriate football managers